Paseka Matsobane Godfrey Mako (born 1 April 1994) is a South African soccer player who plays for the Orlando Pirates as a defender.

References

1994 births
Living people
South African soccer players
Association football defenders
Chippa United F.C. players
Orlando Pirates F.C. players
South African Premier Division players
South Africa international soccer players
South Africa youth international soccer players
Sportspeople from Limpopo